The American Whiskey Trail is the name of a promotional program supported by the Distilled Spirits Council of the United States that promotes the distilled beverage industry in the U.S. The Trail was first promoted to the public on September 28, 2004.

Key sites along the trail

The American Whiskey Trail consists of various historical sites – some with operating distilleries – that are open to the public for tours. Sites along the American Whiskey Trail can be visited in any order or sequence desired, although the George Washington Distillery is promoted as the "gateway" to the trail and is a common starting point.

 Fraunces Tavern Museum in Manhattan, New York
 Gadsby's Tavern Museum in Alexandria, Virginia
 George Washington Distillery Museum in Mount Vernon, Virginia
 Oliver Miller Homestead in South Park, Pennsylvania
Oscar Getz Museum of Whiskey History in Bardstown, Kentucky
 West Overton Village & Museums in Scottdale, Pennsylvania
 Woodville Plantation (John and Presley Neville House) in Bridgeville, Pennsylvania
 Bradford House Museum in Washington, Pennsylvania
Allegany Museum in Cumberland, Maryland

Besides recognized historic sites, a number of operating whiskey distilleries are open to the public for tours and, in many cases, tastings. Most are located in close proximity to each other in Kentucky, although a few are located in Tennessee, Pennsylvania, Utah, and West Virginia.
 Buffalo Trace in Frankfort, Kentucky
 George Dickel in Tullahoma, Tennessee
 Jack Daniel's in Lynchburg, Tennessee
 Jim Beam American Stillhouse in Clermont, Kentucky
Jim Beam Urban Stillhouse in Louisville, Kentucky
Maker's Mark in Loretto, Kentucky
 1792 Bourbon Distillery in Bardstown, Kentucky
Wild Turkey in Lawrenceburg, Kentucky
Woodford Reserve in Versailles, Kentucky
Wigle Whiskey in Pittsburgh, Pennsylvania
Four Roses in Lawrenceburg, Kentucky
Old Forester in Louisville, Kentucky
Angel's Envy in Louisville, Kentucky
Bulleit Frontier Whiskey Experience (Stitzel-Weller Distillery) in Louisville, Kentucky
Town Branch in Lexington, Kentucky
O.Z. Tyler in Owensboro, Kentucky
High West Distillery in Wanship, Utah
Smooth Ambler Distillery in Maxwelton, West Virginia

Distilleries connected to the trail 
In addition to sites and distilleries tied to the history of American whiskey production, the Distilled Spirits Council provides information and promotes a range of other distilleries around the country in conjunction with promotion of the American Whiskey Trail. The list includes two key rum distilleries – Bacardi in Catano, Puerto Rico, and Cruzan in St. Croix, U.S. Virgin Islands – along with various small distilleries. Examples include Golden Moon Distillery, a gin and liqueur producer in Colorado; Koloa Rum Company, a rum producer in Hawaii; Limestone Branch Distillery, a whiskey producer in Kentucky; Black Button Distilling, a whiskey and gin producer in New York; and Tenn South Distillery and Nelson's Green Brier Distillery, two whiskey producers in Tennessee.

See also
 American whiskey
 Kentucky Bourbon Trail

References

Further reading

External links
American Whiskey Trail (official website), Distilled Spirits Council of the United States

Alcohol in the United States
Drinking culture
Historic trails and roads in the United States
Whiskies of the United States
Whisky trails